AIK Hockey Dam is a professional ice hockey team in the Swedish Women's Hockey League (SDHL), the top flight of Swedish's women's ice hockey. They play in Solna Municipality in Stockholm, Sweden at the Ritorps Ishall.

History 
AIK were promoted to Riksserien, the predecessor of the SDHL, in 2008. They won the Swedish Championship twice in their first five top-flight seasons, in 2009 and 2013.

In 2017, the team participated in the Minnesota Whitecaps' tour of Stockholm, playing against them on 22 August.

After dropping in the standings again, down to 7th in the 2017–18 season, Jared Cipparone was brought in to take over as head coach for the club. That summer, the club also slightly increased its investment in its women's side, building a new locker room for the women.

On the 22 February 2020, AIK was eliminated by Djurgårdens IF Hockey in the playoff quarterfinals in a match that went to the third overtime period, passing 100 minutes of game-time and setting an SDHL record for the longest match. After the end of the season, 8th-leading scorer in SDHL history Fanny Rask decided to retire from hockey, citing frustration with the financial insecurity in women's hockey.

Season-by-season record 
This is a partial list of the most recent seasons completed by AIK. 

Code explanation: GP—Games played, W—Wins, L—Losses, T—Tied games, GF—Goals for, GA—Goals against, Pts—Points. Top Scorer: Points (Goals+Assists)

Players and personnel

2022–23 roster 

Coaching staff and team personnel
 Head coach: Carl Wendt 
 Assistant coach: Kevin Törnblom
 Goaltending coach: Robin Blidstrand
 Conditioning coach: Erica Udén Johansson
 Equipment manager: Philip Engström

References

External links 
AIK Hockey Dam – Official site 
 Team information and statistics from Eliteprospects.com and Eurohockey.com

Ice hockey teams in Sweden
Women's ice hockey teams in Europe
Ice hockey teams in Stockholm
Swedish Women's Hockey League teams
Ice hockey teams in Stockholm County